Fabula (from lat. fabula: "story, fable") is a multilingual academic journal on comparative folklore studies with a focus on European narratives (such as fairy tales, sagas, and fables). It publishes essays, reviews, and conference reports in German, English, and French. Its subtitle is: Zeitschrift für Erzählforschung. Journal of Folktale Studies. Revue d'Etudes sur le Conte Populaire.

Since 1958, the journal has been published bi-annually by De Gruyter and is available in both print and online-editions. It was established by the German scholar Kurt Ranke and is currently edited by Brigitte Bönisch-Brednich, Simone Stiefbold, and Harm-Peer Zimmermann. It is closely connected to the multi-volume work Enzyklopädie des Märchens (Encyclopedia of Fairy Tales) and is an official journal of the International Society for Folk Narrative Research. From 1959 till 1970 the Supplement-Serie A, Texte was published.

Abstracting and indexing
The journal is abstracted and indexed in:
EBSCO databases
Scopus
ERIH PLUS
MLA International Bibliography
Scopus
Arts & Humanities Citation Index
Current Contents/Arts & Humanities

References

External links

De Gruyter academic journals
Folklore journals
Publications established in 1958
Multilingual journals
Biannual journals